Sergei Sergeyevich Serdyukov (born 10 April 1981) is a former Russian professional football player.

Club career
He made his Russian Premier League debut for PFC Spartak Nalchik on 18 March 2006 in a game against PFC CSKA Moscow. He played 3 seasons in the Premier League for Spartak Nalchik, FC Tom Tomsk and FC Terek Grozny.

External links
 Player page on the official FC Terek Grozny website 
 
 

1981 births
People from Stavropol Krai
Living people
Russian footballers
FC Dynamo Stavropol players
FC Tom Tomsk players
FC Akhmat Grozny players
PFC Spartak Nalchik players
FC Anzhi Makhachkala players
Russian Premier League players
FC KAMAZ Naberezhnye Chelny players
FC Tyumen players
Association football forwards
FC Orenburg players
Sportspeople from Stavropol Krai
FC Nosta Novotroitsk players
FC Dynamo Makhachkala players